Virna Carole Andrade Jandiroba (born May 30, 1988) is a Brazilian mixed martial artist (MMA), who currently competes in the strawweight division of the UFC. She is a former Invicta Fighting Championships (Invicta) Strawweight champion. As of March 7, 2023, she is #9 in the UFC women's strawweight rankings.

Background
Jandiroba started training kung fu when she was a child. She later turned to Judo and Brazilian jiu-jitsu. She transitioned and competed in mixed martial arts after she earned her Brazilian jiu-jitsu black belt.

Mixed martial arts career

Early career 
Jandiroba started her professional MMA career in 2013 and fought primarily in Brazil. She amassed a record of 11–0 prior to signing for Invicta.

Invicta Fighting Championships
Jandiroba made her Invicta debut on December 8, 2017 at Invicta FC 26: Maia vs. Niedwiedz against Amy Montenegro. She won the fight, tapping out Montenegro via first-round armbar.

Jandiroba was scheduled to face Janaisa Morandin on March 24, 2018 at  Invicta FC 28: Mizuki vs. Jandiroba for the Invicta strawweight championship. However, Morandin was forced to pulled out due to  a tooth infection and she was replaced by Mizuki Inoue. She won the fight via a split decision with the scoreboard of (49-46, 46-49, 49-46) and crowned Invicta FC Strawweight Champion.

On September 1, 2018, Jandiroba made her first title defense at Invicta FC 31: Jandiroba vs. Morandin against Janaisa Morandin.  She submitted Morandin in the second round and retained the Invicta FC Strawweight Championship title.

Ultimate Fighting Championship
In her UFC debut, Jandiroba replaced an injured Lívia Renata Souza against Carla Esparza on April 27, 2019 at UFC Fight Night: Jacaré vs. Hermansson. She lost the fight by unanimous decision.

While the Esparza fight did not go Jandiroba's way, Jandiroba believes that fight, her first professional loss, was responsible for the subsequent growth and wins she has notched in the UFC.

Jandiroba was expected to face Cortney Casey on December 7, 2019 at UFC on ESPN 7. However, Casey withdrew from the event for an undisclosed reason and she was replaced by Lívia Renata Souza. In turn Souza withdrew from the bout due to a back injury and she was replaced by Mallory Martin Jandiroba won the fight via submission in the second round.

Jandiroba faced Felice Herrig on August 15, 2020 at UFC 252. She won the fight via an armbar submission in the first round. This win earned her the Performance of the Night award.

Jandiroba faced Mackenzie Dern on December 12, 2020 at UFC 256. She lost the fight by unanimous decision.

Jandiroba faced Kanako Murata on June 19, 2021 at UFC on ESPN 25. She won the bout after the doctor stopped the fight after round 2 due to a elbow dislocation caused by armbar applied by Jandiroba.

Jandiroba faced Amanda Ribas on October 30, 2021 at UFC 267. She lost the bout via unanimous decision.

Jandiroba faced Angela Hill on May 14, 2022 at UFC on ESPN 36. She won the bout via unanimous decision.

Jandirobais scheduled to face Marina Rodriguez on May 6, 2023, at UFC 288.

Championships and accomplishments

Mixed martial arts 
 Ultimate Fighting Championship
Performance of the Night (One time) .
 Invicta Fighting Championships
 Invicta Fighting Championships Strawweight Champion
 One title defense (vs. Janaisa Morandin)
 Performance of the Night (Two times) vs. Amy Montenegro and Janaisa Morandin

Mixed martial arts record

|-
|Win
|align=center|18–3
|Angela Hill 
|Decision (unanimous)
|UFC on ESPN: Błachowicz vs. Rakić 
| 
|align=center|3
|align=center|5:00
|Las Vegas, Nevada, United States
|
|-
|Loss
|align=center|17–3
|Amanda Ribas 
|Decision (unanimous)
|UFC 267 
|
|align=center|3
|align=center|5:00
|Abu Dhabi, United Arab Emirates
|  
|-
|Win
|align=center|17–2
|Kanako Murata
|TKO (arm injury)
|UFC on ESPN: The Korean Zombie vs. Ige 
|
|align=center|2
|align=center|5:00
|Las Vegas, Nevada, United States
|
|-
|Loss
|align=center|16–2
|Mackenzie Dern
|Decision (unanimous)
|UFC 256
|
|align=center|3
|align=center|5:00
|Las Vegas, Nevada, United States
|
|-
|Win
|align=center|16–1
|Felice Herrig
|Submission (armbar)
|UFC 252
|
|align=center|1
|align=center|1:44
|Las Vegas, Nevada, United States
|
|-
|Win
|align=center| 15–1
|Mallory Martin
|Submission (rear-naked choke)
|UFC on ESPN: Overeem vs. Rozenstruik 
|
|align=center|2
|align=center|1:16
|Washington, D.C., United States
|
|-
|Loss
|align=center| 14–1
|Carla Esparza
|Decision (unanimous)
|UFC Fight Night: Jacaré vs. Hermansson 
|
|align=center|3
|align=center|5:00
|Sunrise, Florida, United States
|
|-
| Win
| align=center| 14–0
| Janaisa Morandin
| Submission (arm-triangle choke) 
| Invicta FC 31: Jandiroba vs. Morandin
| 
| align=center| 2
| align=center| 2:23
| Kansas City, Missouri, United States
|
|-
| Win
| align=center| 13–0
| Mizuki Inoue
| Decision (split)
| Invicta FC 28: Mizuki vs. Jandiroba 
| 
| align=center| 5
| align=center| 5:00
| Salt Lake City, Utah, United States
| 
|-
| Win
| align=center| 12–0
| Amy Montenegro
| Submission (armbar)
| Invicta FC 26: Maia vs. Niedwiedz 
| 
| align=center| 1
| align=center| 2:50
| Kansas City, Missouri, United States
| 
|-
| Win
| align=center| 11–0
| Ericka Almeida
| Decision (split)
| Fight 2 Night 2
| 
| align=center| 3
| align=center| 5:00
| Foz do Iguaçu, Brazil
|
|-
| Win
| align=center| 10–0
| Suiane Teixeira dos Santos
| Submission (armbar)
| MMA Pro 12
| 
| align=center| 1
| align=center| 0:46
| Serrinha, Brazil
|
|-
| Win
| align=center| 9–0
| Lisa Ellis
| Submission (rear-naked choke)
| Fight 2 Night
| 
| align=center| 1
| align=center| 2:21
| Rio de Janeiro, Brazil
|
|-
| Win
| align=center| 8–0
| Cristiane Lima Silva
| Submission (rear-naked choke)
| Fight On 3
| 
| align=center| 1
| align=center| 2:34
| Salvador, Brazil
|
|-
| Win
| align=center| 7–0
| Anne Karoline Nascimento
| Submission (armbar)
| Circuito MNA de MMA 2
| 
| align=center| 2
| align=center| 3:29
| Seabra, Brazil
|
|-
| Win
| align=center| 6–0
| Aline Sattelmayer
| Decision (unanimous)
| The King of Arena Fight 2
| 
| align=center| 3
| align=center| 5:00
| Alagoinhas, Brazil
|
|-
| Win
| align=center| 5–0
| Cristiane Lima Silva
| Submission (rear-naked choke)
| Velame Fight Combat 4
| 
| align=center| 1
| align=center| 2:53
| Feira de Santana, Brazil
|
|-
| Win
| align=center| 4–0
| Carla Ramos
| Submission (triangle choke)
| Banzay Fight Championship 2
| 
| align=center| 1
| align=center| 1:50
| Candeias, Brazil
|
|-
| Win
| align=center| 3–0
| Camila Lima
| Submission (rear-naked choke)
| MMA Super Heroes 7
| 
| align=center| 2
| align=center| 4:30
| São Paulo, Brazil
|
|-
| Win
| align=center| 2–0
| Gina Brito Silva Santana
| Submission (rear-naked choke)
| The Iron Fight 2
| 
| align=center| 3
| align=center| N/A
| Euclides da Cunha, Brazil
|
|-
| Win
| align=center| 1–0
| Joana Santana
| Submission (rear-naked choke)
| Premier Fight League 10
| 
| align=center| 1
| align=center| 0:41
| Serrinha, Brazil
|
|-

See also
List of current UFC fighters
List of female mixed martial artists

References

External links
 
 

Living people
1989 births
Sportspeople from Bahia
Brazilian female mixed martial artists
Strawweight mixed martial artists
Mixed martial artists utilizing Muay Thai
Mixed martial artists utilizing judo
Mixed martial artists utilizing Brazilian jiu-jitsu
Brazilian practitioners of Brazilian jiu-jitsu
People awarded a black belt in Brazilian jiu-jitsu
Female Brazilian jiu-jitsu practitioners
Brazilian Muay Thai practitioners
Female Muay Thai practitioners
Ultimate Fighting Championship female fighters
Brazilian female judoka